Annasaheb Magar was the former MP of 6th Lok Sabha, affiliated to Indian National Congress serving Khed (MH) Lok Sabha Constituency.

References

India MPs 1977–1979
Indian National Congress politicians
Living people
Lok Sabha members from Maharashtra
Year of birth missing (living people)
People from Pimpri-Chinchwad
Indian National Congress politicians from Maharashtra